Culex (Lophoceraomyia) lasiopalpis is a species of mosquito belonging to the genus Culex. It is endemic to Sri Lanka, and some texts cited it from India.

References 

lasiopalpis
Insects described in 1977